Bryan Andrei Still (born June 3, 1974) is a former American football wide receiver in the National Football League. He was the MVP of the 1995 Sugar Bowl.

College career
Still played college football for the Virginia Tech Hokies. He finished his career at Virginia Tech with 74 catches for 1,458 yards and 11 touchdowns, and was named MVP of the 1995 Sugar Bowl, in which Virginia Tech defeated Texas 28–10 on December 31, 1995.  In this game, Still had 6 catches for 119 yards and 1 touchdown, and also returned a punt 60 yards for another touchdown.

Professional career
He was a second round selection (41st overall pick) by the San Diego Chargers in the 1996 NFL Draft. He played for the San Diego Chargers (1996–1999), the Atlanta Falcons (1999), and the Dallas Cowboys (1999).

Post-NFL
Still teaches health education and physical education. He also coached  track and field for 15 years (2006-2020) at Cosby High School in Midlothian, Virginia.

References

1974 births
Living people
African-American schoolteachers
Schoolteachers from Virginia
Sportspeople from Newport News, Virginia
Players of American football from Virginia
American football wide receivers
Virginia Tech Hokies football players
San Diego Chargers players
Atlanta Falcons players
21st-century African-American people
20th-century African-American people